Denis Calincov (born 15 September 1985) is a Moldovan football manager and former professional footballer who played as a striker. He has played international matches for Moldova.

Club career
Calincov joined Anderlecht on a three-year deal at the age of 16 from CSF Zimbru Chisinau in his homeland. A combination of injuries and form frustrated his attempts to make a first-team appearance at Anderlecht. In 2004 the left winger joined Dutch UEFA Cup entrants SC Heerenveen making only two appearances for the club. He was then signed for the 2005 campaign by Heracles Almelo. He was injured for almost a year, after tearing a muscle in his abdomen.

Later followed a two-year stay by SC Cambuur without any success. He returned to his home country, Moldova to play for Academia UTM Chişinău.

In Summer 2009, he signed for Azerbaijani club, Khazar Lankaran.

International career
Calincov attracted the attention of several major clubs across Europe at the 2002 UEFA European Under-17 Championship in Denmark. Moldova lost all three games in the tournament, but Calincov scored five goals. He has also been capped at U19, U21 and senior level.

Managerial career
Calincov started managing Spicul Chișcăreni, before being appointed head coach of Codru Lozova in 2020.

International goals
Scores and results list Moldova's goal tally first.

References

External links

Player's profile – moldova.sports.md
heracles.nl 

with SC Heerenveen 

1985 births
Living people
Footballers from Chișinău
Moldovan footballers
Moldovan expatriate footballers
Moldova international footballers
Eredivisie players
R.S.C. Anderlecht players
SC Heerenveen players
Heracles Almelo players
SC Cambuur players
Khazar Lankaran FK players
FC Academia Chișinău players
FC Dacia Chișinău players
FC Rapid Ghidighici players
FC Veris Chișinău players
FC Tiraspol players
Speranța Nisporeni players
FC Spicul Chișcăreni players
Expatriate footballers in Belgium
Expatriate footballers in the Netherlands
Expatriate footballers in Azerbaijan
Moldovan expatriate sportspeople in the Netherlands
Moldovan expatriate sportspeople in Azerbaijan
Association football forwards
Moldovan football managers
FC Zimbru Chișinău players
Moldovan Super Liga players
Moldovan Super Liga managers